Richard A. Gabriel is a historian and author.

He is a former adjunct professor in the Department of History and War Studies at the Royal Military College of Canada and in the Department of Defence Studies at the Canadian Forces College in Toronto.

He is the author of books including Scipio Africanus: Rome’s Greatest General, Hannibal: The Military Biography of Rome’s Greatest Enemy, The Great Armies of Antiquity, Man and Wound in the Ancient World  and Military Incompetence. David Olle of  Nyjournalofbooks praised Gabriel's writing style as "accessible and engaging." In a review of Great Generals of the Ancient World, William Brown of Worldhistory.org wrote that  "Gabriel's discussion is problematic in terms of his source material: how he uses primary sources and secondary material" and labelled his approach to historical sources as "uncritical and uninformed."

Works

Great Generals of the Ancient World (2017)
God's Generals (2016)
The Madness of Alexander the Great: And the Myth of Military Genius (2015)
Between Flesh and Steel: A History of Military Medicine from the Middle Ages to the War in Afghanistan (2013)
Hannibal: The Military Biography of Rome's Greatest Enemy (2011)
Man and Wound in the Ancient World: A History of Military Medicine from Sumer to the Fall of Constantinople (2011)
Philip II of Macedonia: Greater than Alexander (2010)
Thutmose III: The Military Biography of Egypt's Greatest Warrior King (2009)
Scipio Africanus: Rome’s Greatest General (2007)
Muhammad: Islam’s First Great General (2007)
Soldiers: Military Life in Antiquity (2006)
Jesus the Egyptian:The Origins of Christianity and the Psychology of Christ (2005)
Ancient Empires at War, 3 vols. (2005)
Subotai the Valiant: Genghis Khan’s Greatest General (2004)
Lion of the Sun (2003)
The Military History of Ancient Israel (2003)
Great Armies of Antiquity (2002)
Sebastian’s Cross (2002)
Gods of our Fathers: The Memory of Egypt in Judaism and Christianity(2001)
Warrior Pharaoh (2001)
Great Captains of Antiquity (2000)
Great Battles of Antiquity (1994)
A Short History of War: Evolution of Warfare and Weapons (1994)
History of Military Medicine:Ancient Times to the Middle Ages (1992)
History of Military Medicine: Renaissance to the Present (1992)
From Sumer to Rome: The Military Capabilities of Ancient Armies (1991)
The Culture of War: Invention and Early Development (1990)
The Painful Field: Psychiatric Dimensions of Modern War (1988)
No More Heroes: Madness and Psychiatry in War (1987)
The Last Centurion (French, 1987)
Military Psychiatry: A Comparative Perspective (1986)
Soviet Military Psychiatry (1986)
Military Incompetence: Why the US Military Doesn’t Win (1985)
Operation Peace for Galilee: The Israeli-PLO War in Lebanon (1985)
The Antagonists: An Assessment of the Soviet and American Soldier (1984)
The Mind of the Soviet Fighting Man (1984)
Fighting Armies: NATO and the Warsaw Pact (1983)
Fighting Armies: Antagonists of the Middle East (1983)
Fighting Armies: Armies of the Third World (1983)
To Serve With Honor: A Treatise on Military Ethics (1982)
The New Red Legions: An Attitudinal Portrait of the Soviet Soldier (1980)
The New Red Legions: A Survey Data Sourcebook (1980)
Managers and Gladiators: Directions of Change in the Army (1978)
Crisis in Command: Mismanagement in the Army (1978)
Ethnic Groups in America (1978)
Program Evaluation:A Social Science Approach (1978)
The Ethnic Factor in the Urban Polity (1973)

References

External links

 https://potomac.presswarehouse.com/Books/AuthorDetail.aspx?id=13197

Living people
Canadian military historians
Academic staff of the Royal Military College of Canada
Year of birth missing (living people)